The 1938 Memphis Red Sox baseball team represented the Memphis Red Sox in the Negro American League (NAL) during the 1938 baseball season. The team compiled a 40–35–1 record and won the NAL pennant. 

The team's leading batters were:
 Right fielder Nat Rogers - .353 batting average, .520 slugging percentage, two home runs, 19 RBIs in 27 games
 Center fielder Lloyd Davenport - .322 batting average, .417 slugging percentage, in 31 games
 Shortstop Neil Robinson - .316 batting average, .453 slugging percentage in 34 games

The team's leading pitcher was Lefty Wilson (4–2, 3.06 ERA).

References

1938 in sports in Tennessee
Negro league baseball seasons